Croatia selected its entry for the 1996 Eurovision Song Contest through the "Dora 1996" contest, which was held on 3 March 1996, organised by the Croatian national broadcaster Hrvatska radiotelevizija (HRT) in Opatija. The winner was Maja Blagdan with "Sveta ljubav".

Before Eurovision

Dora 1996 
HRT organised the Dora contest to select the Croatian entry to the Eurovision Song Contest 1996, held in Opatija. The national contest consisted of a televised final with 20 songs selected from a public call for submissions from songwriters and composers. The winner was chosen by 20 regional juries.

At Eurovision
In 1996, for the only time in Eurovision history, an audio-only qualifying round of the 29 songs entered (excluding hosts Norway who were exempt) was held in March in order for the seven lowest-scoring songs to be eliminated before the final. "Sveta ljubav" received 30 points, placing 19th and thus qualifying for the final.

On the night of the contest Maja Blagdan performed 7th, following Malta and preceding the Austria. The song received 98 points at the close of the voting, placing 4th of 23 countries competing. This was, and still is as of 2022, Croatia's joint-best placing at the contest, sharing with Croatia's 1999 entry, "Marija Magdalena" with Doris Dragović.

Voting

Qualifying round

Final

References

External links
Dora 1996 at the Eurofest Croatia website 

1996
Countries in the Eurovision Song Contest 1996
Eurovision